Mikael Bongili Ndjoli (born 8 October 1997) is an English professional footballer who plays for Radcliffe, on loan from  club Hartlepool United, as a forward. He is a product of the Millwall and Brentford academies and signed his first professional contract with Bournemouth in 2016. He gained experienced on loan at EFL club Gillingham and Scottish Premiership clubs Kilmarnock and Motherwell. Following his departure from Bournemouth in 2021, Ndjoli played for Barrow, Aldershot Town and American lower-league club Virginia Beach City FC. He transferred to Hartlepool United in 2022.

Career

Youth years 
A forward, Ndjoli began his career with spells at Tottenham Hotspur and Watford, before entering the academy at Brentford. He was a part of the U15 team which won the Junior category at the 2012 Milk Cup. He moved on to join the academy at Millwall and embarked on a two-year scholarship in 2014. Despite scoring 20 goals in 24 matches for the U18 team and breaking into the U21 team during the 2015–16 season, Ndjoli departed the club in June 2016, after failing to be awarded a professional contract.

Bournemouth
In July 2016, Ndjoli signed his first professional contract to join the U21 team at Premier League club Bournemouth on an initial one-year deal and he was a part of the team which reached the 2017 Hampshire Senior Cup Final. Ndjoli progressed sufficiently during the 2017–18 season to win his only first team call-up for a FA Cup fourth round match versus Wigan Athletic on 18 January 2018 and he remained an unused substitute during the 3–0 defeat. After finishing the 2017–18 season with 30 goals for the U21 team, it was announced in May 2018 that Ndjoli had signed a new one-year contract. He spent 2018–19 away on loan and signed a new two-year contract at the end of the season. Ndjoli spent much of the COVID-19-affected 2019–20 season away on loan, but despite Bournemouth's relegation to the Championship, he did not win a call into a first-team squad during the first half of the 2020–21 season. On 1 February 2021, Ndjoli agreed a mutual termination of his contract and he departed Dean Court.

Kilmarnock (loan)
On 4 July 2018, Ndjoli joined Scottish Premiership club Kilmarnock on a half-season loan, which was later extended until the end of the 2018–19 season. He made 31 appearances and scored five goals during the season, with four of the goals coming in a four-game spell in late-July and early-August 2018.

Gillingham (loan)
On 26 June 2019, Ndjoli joined League One club Gillingham on loan for the duration of the 2019–20 season. He scored his first goal on his third appearance, with an injury time penalty in an EFL Cup first round match versus Newport County on 10 August 2019, but was almost immediately sent off for the first time in his senior career, for two bookable offences. Ndjoli's loan was ended on 8 January 2020, by which time he had made 18 appearances and scored three goals.

Motherwell (loan)
On 13 January 2020, Ndjoli returned to Scotland to join Scottish Premiership club Motherwell on loan until the end of the 2019–20 season. He made two substitute appearances before suffering an injury in training in mid-February. Ndjoli failed to win an further call-ups before the season was ended early due to the COVID-19 pandemic.

Barrow 
On 1 February 2021, Ndjoli joined League Two club Barrow on a free transfer and signed a contract until the end of the 2020–21 season. He made two substitute appearances before dropping out of the squad in late March and was released when his contract expired.

Aldershot Town 
On 5 October 2021, Ndjoli signed a contract with National League club Aldershot Town on a free transfer. He ended the 2021–22 season with 23 appearances and a career-high six goals. Ndjoli was offered a new contract in May 2022, but elected to depart the club.

Virginia Beach City FC 
In June 2022, Ndjoli transferred to National Premier Soccer League club Virginia Beach City FC. He scored four goals in five appearances, before departing the club in mid-July 2022.

Hartlepool United
On 22 July 2022, Ndjoli returned to England to sign a two-year contract with League Two club Hartlepool United. Ndoji made his first start for the club on 27 August 2022 in a 4–2 defeat away to Leyton Orient. Three days later, he scored twice in a 2–0 EFL Trophy win against Harrogate Town. In March 2023, Ndjoli moved on loan to Northern Premier League Premier Division side Radcliffe for the remainder of the season.

Personal life
Born in England, Ndjoli is of Congolese descent.

Career statistics

References

External links

Mikael Ndjoli at hartlepoolunited.co.uk
Mikael Ndjoli at premierleague.com

1998 births
Living people
Footballers from Greater London
English footballers
English sportspeople of Democratic Republic of the Congo descent
Black British sportspeople
AFC Bournemouth players
Association football forwards
Association football wingers
Scottish Professional Football League players
Kilmarnock F.C. players
Gillingham F.C. players
Motherwell F.C. players
English Football League players
Barrow A.F.C. players
Aldershot Town F.C. players
Virginia Beach City FC players
Hartlepool United F.C. players
Radcliffe F.C. players